Ayanbadejo is a Nigerian surname. Notable people with the surname include:

Brendon Ayanbadejo (born 1976), American football linebacker 
Obafemi Ayanbadejo (born 1975), American football fullback, brother of Brendon

Surnames of Nigerian origin